Bailey County is a county located in the U.S. state of Texas. It is in West Texas and its county seat is Muleshoe.

As of the 2020 census, its population was 6,904.

History
In 1876, the Texas Legislature established Bailey County from portions of Bexar County, naming it for Peter James Bailey, a defender of the Alamo. (See List of Texas county name etymologies.) The county organized in 1919.

Bailey County history is highlighted in the Muleshoe Heritage Center located off U.S. Highways 70 and 64 in Muleshoe. The Muleshoe National Wildlife Refuge was founded in 1935 and is the oldest such refuge in Texas.

Bailey County once was one of 30 prohibition or entirely dry counties in Texas, but is now a wet county.

Geography

Major highways
  U.S. Highway 70
  U.S. Highway 84
  State Highway 214

Adjacent counties
 Parmer County (north)
 Lamb County (east)
 Hockley County (southeast)
 Cochran County (south)
 Roosevelt County, New Mexico (west/Mountain Time Zone)
 Curry County, New Mexico (northwest/Mountain Time Zone)

National protected areas
 Grulla National Wildlife Refuge (part)
 Muleshoe National Wildlife Refuge

Demographics

As of the 2010 United States census, 7,165 people lived in the county. About 75.3% were White, 1.4% Native American, 1.2% Black or African American, 0.4% Asian, 0.1% Pacific Islander, 19.6% of some other race, and 2.0% of two or more races; 59.8% were Hispanics or Latinos (of any race).

As of the census of 2000, 6,594 people, 2,348 households, and 1,777 families lived in the county.  The population density was eight people per square mile (3/km2).  The 2,738 housing units averaged three per square mile (1/km2).  The racial makeup of the county was 66.68% White, 1.27% Black or African American, 0.65% Native American, 0.14% Asian, 28.60% from other races, and 2.65% from two or more races;  47.30% of the population were Hispanic or Latino of any race.

Of the 2,348 households, 37.1% had children under living with them, 64.9% were married couples living together, 7.5% had a female householder with no husband present, and 24.3% were not families. About 22.3% of all households were made up of individuals, and 12.8% had someone living alone who was 65  or older.  The average household size was 2.78, and the average family size was 3.28.

In the county, the age distribution was 30.3% under  18, 8.6% from 18 to 24, 24.7% from 25 to 44, 21.2% from 45 to 64, and 15.2% who were 65 years of age or older.  The median age was 35 years. For every 100 females, there were 96.0 males.  For every 100 females age 18 and over, there were 94.1 males.

The median income for a household in the county was $27,901, and for a family was $32,898. Males had a median income of $25,150 versus $18,309 for females. The per capita income for the county was $12,979.  About 13.50% of families and 16.70% of the population were below the poverty line, including 20.40% of those under age 18 and 12.60% of those age 65 or over.

Education
Most of Bailey County is served by the Muleshoe Independent School District, which extends into neighboring counties. Farwell Independent School District and Sudan Independent School District, which are based in nearby counties, extend into Bailey County and serve small portions of it.

Three Way Independent School District formerly served a part of Bailey County. It closed in 2002, becoming a part of Sudan ISD.

The county is in the service area of South Plains College.

Communities

City
 Muleshoe (county seat)

Unincorporated communities
 Baileyboro
 Bula
 Circle Back
 Enochs
 Goodland 
 Maple 
 Needmore
 Progress

Ghost town
 Virginia City

Politics

See also 

 Dry counties
 Recorded Texas Historic Landmarks in Bailey County

References

External links

 
 
 Bailey County from the Texas Almanac
 Bailey County from the TXGenWeb Project
 Bailey County Profile from the Texas Association of Counties

 
1919 establishments in Texas
Populated places established in 1919
Majority-minority counties in Texas